Seth Edulji (or Eduljee) Dinshaw  (18 May 1842 - 8 May 1914) was a Karachi-based Parsi philanthropist during the British colonial era. Dinshaw had risen from poverty, and became the largest landowner in the city.

Business interests
Dinshaw was born in Karachi on 18 May 1842. A member of the Parsi community, he made his initial fortune during the Second Afghan War (1878–1881) by being a contractor for the British Army. He then took his wealth and invested it in land and factories which reaped him huge rewards. By the late nineteenth century, he owned around half of the city of Karachi, and the local government is believed to have placed an informal ban on his acquiring any more. His enterprises included a factory for pressing cotton and wool for export and an ice factory.

Philanthropy
He donated large sums of money for various charitable works which benefited both his own community as well as the general public at large. These included:

Hospitals and dispensaries

 Lady Dufferin Hospital. When the Vicerene, Lady Dufferin, collected funds to build a hospital in Karachi in 1884, she collected Rs 10,000 from the whole population of the city.  Edulji Dinshaw, personally, gave Rs 85,000.
Edulji Dinshaw Dispensary. In 1882, Edulji Dinshaw commissioned the architect James Strachan to build an Italianate charitable dispensary in Saddar in Karachi - the dispensary still functions today.
 Nadirshaw Edulji Dinshaw Dispensary

Education, art and architecture
 In 1885 and again in 1887, he gave Rs. 3000/- towards the college fund of Sind Art College in Karachi.
 He donated a bust of King Edward VII which stood in Frere Hall in the Civil Lines area of Karachi.
 In 1890, he also commissioned a marble fountain, which had seraphs as the central feature of its design, which stands in the gardens of Frere Hall, and which has fallen into disrepair in recent years
 In the 1910s he donated Rs 75,000 to the Mama Parsi Girls' School in Karachi, and started a hostel in the school.

Parsi community
 The Bachubai Edulji Dinshaw Nirashrit Fund
 The Soonabai Edulji Dinshaw Charitable Fund

Other involvements
He was a Director of Land and Shipping Co and a delegate of the Parsi Matrimonial Court. He was also a Trustee of the Karachi Port Trust (KPT), located on Eduljee Dinshaw Road, and a member of Karachi Municipal Corporation (KMC).

British honour
For his services to the public, he was the first person in the city to be appointed a Companion of the Order of the Indian Empire (CIE). The award was announced in the 1899 New Year Honours list on 2 January 1899, and he was invested by Queen Victoria at Windsor Castle on 1 March 1900.

Death
On 8 May 1914, while on his way to England, he died at sea, near Port Said, Egypt.

Statues 
In recognition of his contribution and that of his first son Nadirshaw, to the city of Karachi, statues of them were placed at the intersection of Karachi's main roads in the 1930s. When unveiling the statue of Edulji Dinshaw, Sir Frederick Sykes, then Governor of Bombay, remarked that 'It is peculiarly appropriate that the city of Karachi should choose Mr. Edulji Dinshaw as a fitting subject to be honored by the erection of a statue in one of the most imposing and important sites in the whole town, for he had the vision to recognize fully the possibilities of greatness that the city held and also contributed very largely himself to developing it.' After partition, the statues were removed, and can now be seen in the grounds of the Karachi Parsi Institute.

Family
He had two sons, Nadirshaw Edulji Dinshaw and Framroze Edulji Dinshaw (known as FE Dinshaw).

Gallery

His grandson Hoshang NE Dinshaw, who was Nadirshaw Edulji Dinshaw's oldest son, played an important part in the economic development of Pakistan, including as the President of the Central Board of Directors of the National Bank of Pakistan.

The descendants of Seth Edulji Dinshaw have kept up his philanthropic tradition.  The Edulji Dinshaw family remains particularly noted for their charitable donations, especially to non-Parsis.

References

Further reading
 The Karachi Zoroastrian Calendar, A record of Important Events in the Growth of the Parsi Community in Karachi. compiled by Jehangir Framroze Punthakey, Translated English version. Reprinted in 1996.

External links
Akhtar Balouch. Heroes forgotten: Searching for the Dinshaws of Karachi: Dinshaw, Seth Edulji Dawn  September 26, 2015. Retrieved 11 April 2021.

Parsi people
1914 deaths
People from Karachi
Companions of the Order of the Indian Empire
Indian Zoroastrians
1842 births
19th-century Indian philanthropists